Pfitz is a novel by Scottish physicist and author Andrew Crumey. It concerns an 18th-century German prince who dedicates his life to the construction of imaginary cities. The name Pfitz is taken from an inhabitant of one of the prince's fanciful cities, Rreinnstadt.

In 1997, the book was named a notable book of the year by The New York Times. Andrew Miller of The New York Times said it, "makes for rewarding reading -- cerebral, adroit, not afraid to take chances but never allowing itself to be seduced by theory, by mere cleverness."

The novel has attracted academic interest in relation to complexity theory.

References

1995 British novels
Novels by Andrew Crumey
Novels set in Germany
Novels set in the 18th century